The Rural Municipality of Caron No. 162 is a rural municipality (RM) in the Canadian province of Saskatchewan within Census Division No. 7 and  Division No. 2. It is located in the southwest portion of the province.

History 
The RM of Caron No. 162 incorporated as a rural municipality on December 9, 1912.

Geography 
The burrowing owl (Athene cunicularia), an endangered animal, makes its home in this area. As well, the smooth arid goosefoot (Chenopodium subglabrum) and long-billed curlew (Numenius americanus) is of special concern in the ecoregion.

Communities and localities 
The following urban municipalities are surrounded by the RM.

Villages
Caronport

The following unincorporated communities are within the RM.

Organized hamlets
Caron

Localities
Abound
Archydal
Archydal Airport
Caron
Grayburn
Grayburn Airport
McKeown Airport

Demographics 

Attractions 
Besant Recreation Site is along the Trans Canada Highway.

Government 
The RM of Caron No. 162 is governed by an elected municipal council and an appointed administrator that meets on the second Thursday of every month. The reeve of the RM is Gregory McKeown while its administrator is John Morris. The RM's office is located in Moose Jaw.

References 

C

Division No. 7, Saskatchewan